Radcliffe is a neighborhood in northern Lexington, Kentucky, United States. It is alternatively called Marlboro. Its boundaries are Dover Road to the south, Paris Pike to the east, Russell Cave Road to the west, and I-75/ I-64 to the north.

Neighborhood statistics
 Area: 
 Population: 1,853
 Population density: 3,522 people per square mile (1,362.5/km2) 
 Median household income: $57,218

References

Neighborhoods in Lexington, Kentucky